The Grammy Award for Best Southern, Country or Bluegrass Gospel Album was an honor presented at the Grammy Awards, a ceremony that was established in 1958 and originally called the Gramophone Awards, to artists, producers, and engineers for quality gospel music albums. Honors in several categories are presented at the ceremony annually by the National Academy of Recording Arts and Sciences (NARAS) of the United States to "honor artistic achievement, technical proficiency and overall excellence in the recording industry, without regard to album sales or chart position".

Originally called the Grammy Award for Best Southern Gospel Album, the award was first presented to Bruce Carroll at the 33rd Grammy Awards in 1991 for the album The Great Exchange. Three years later, the category's name was changed to the Best Southern Gospel, Country Gospel or Bluegrass Gospel Album.  The category's name was changed to Best Southern, Country or Bluegrass Gospel Album in 1998. After 2011 it was merged with the Grammy Award for Best Rock Gospel Album and the Grammy Award for Best Pop/Contemporary Gospel Album, forming the Grammy Award for Best Contemporary Christian Music Album. The NARAS made this change in order to "tighten the number of categories" at the Grammy Awards. In 2015, a similar category, Best Roots Gospel Album was introduced.

Bill Gaither has the most wins in the category, with a total of four: two from his work in the Gaither Vocal Band, and another two in combination with his wife, Gloria. Randy Travis has won one less Grammy than Gaither in this category, with three. Gaither has the most nominations in the category, with eleven; the Light Crust Doughboys have eight, trailing Gaither by three nominations. Kyle Lehning holds the record for most wins as a producer or engineer, with a total of three. Nominated bands include Karen Peck and New River, who were selected in three of the final four years of the Grammy, and the Cathedral Quartet.

Recipients

 Each year is linked to the article about the Grammy Awards held that year.

References

General 
  Note: User must select the "Gospel" category as the genre under the search feature.

Specific 

Grammy Awards for country music
Grammy Awards for gospel music